William R. DeAngelis (born October 5, 1946) is a retired American professional basketball player who spent one season in the American Basketball Association (ABA) with the New York Nets during the 1970–71 season. He attended Saint Joseph's University.

DeAngelis grew up in Cherry Hill, New Jersey and graduated in 1964 from what is now Cherry Hill High School West; he was later inducted into the school's athletic hall of fame.

DeAngelis also played baseball at Saint Joseph's, and was inducted into the school's baseball hall of fame in 2004, recognizing his accomplishments as a middle infielder who had a career batting average of .303 and set season and career records for triples.

References

External links
 

1946 births
Living people
American men's basketball players
Basketball players from New Jersey
Cherry Hill High School West alumni
Delaware Blue Bombers players
New York Nets players
People from Cherry Hill, New Jersey
Point guards
Saint Joseph's Hawks baseball players
Saint Joseph's Hawks men's basketball players
Sportspeople from Camden County, New Jersey
Wilmington Blue Bombers players